...And You Will Know Us by the Trail of Dead is the first full-length release from rock band ...And You Will Know Us by the Trail of Dead. It was released on January 20, 1998, by Trance Syndicate.

Track listing

Personnel
Richard McIntosh – Photography
Dave McNair – Mixing
Chris "Frenchie" Smith – Producer
Mike McCarthy – Engineer
Kevin Allen – Producer
Jason Reece – Producer
Conrad Keely – Producer, Cover Design
Chris Cline – Producer, Editing, Mastering, Mixing

References

1998 debut albums
...And You Will Know Us by the Trail of Dead albums
Trance Syndicate albums
Albums produced by Chris "Frenchie" Smith